The 2021–22 Women's Senior One Day Trophy was the 16th edition of the women's List A cricket competition in India. It took place from 28 October to 20 November 2021, with 37 teams competing in six round-robin divisions. Railways, who were the defending champions, won their 13th one-day title, beating Karnataka in the final.

Competition format
37 teams competed in the tournament, divided into the Elite Group and the Plate Group, with the teams in the Elite Group further divided into Groups A, B, C, D and E. Each group took place in one host city, under COVID-19 protocols. The top two teams in each Elite Group progressed to the knockout stages, along with the top team from the Plate Group. The five Elite Group winners progressed straight to the quarter-finals, whilst the remaining six teams competed in the pre-quarter-finals.

The groups worked on a points system with positions with the groups being based on the total points. Points were awarded as follows:

Win: 4 points. 
Tie: 2 points. 
Loss: 0 points. 
No Result/Abandoned: 2 points.

If points in the final table were equal, teams were separated by most wins, then head-to-head record, then Net Run Rate.

League stage

Points tables

Elite Group A

Elite Group B

Elite Group C

Elite Group D

Elite Group E

Plate Group

Source: BCCI

 advanced to the quarter-finals.
 advanced to the pre-quarter-finals.

Fixtures

Elite Group A

Elite Group B

Elite Group C

Elite Group D

Elite Group E

Plate Group

Knockout stages

Pre-quarter-finals

Quarter-finals

Semi-finals

Final

Statistics

Most runs

Source: CricketArchive

Most wickets

Source: CricketArchive

References

Women's Senior One Day Trophy
Domestic cricket competitions in 2021–22
2021 in Indian cricket